Christos Batzios (Greek: Χρήστος Μπάτζιος, born 14 May) is a Greek actor, filmmaker and athlete. He is known for his film roles and athletic performances.

Life and career
Batzios was born in Kavala, a city in northern Greece. When he was fifteen, he moved to Thessaloniki, Greece, where he attended Mandoulides Highschool and began playing in several basketball clubs. He is also an athlete of martial arts, such as MMA and Wing Chun, and track & field. He graduated from the Aristotle University of Thessaloniki with a B.A in Physical Education.

Christos Batzios started taking theater and film acting lessons along with studying in the university.

He later moved to Athens, Greece where he continued to take acting and voice lessons, until 2010 where he made his professional debut in theater. In 2011, Batzios presented his most well known play, the comedy Things to be ashamed of (Greek: Ντροπής Πράγματα), which was popular in Greece and Cyprus for 3 seasons, touring in more than 80 cities.
 
Batzios has played in several movies and theater plays, including many short films, documentaries, videoclips and other art projects. He has collaborated with directors in Greece, France and United Kingdom.
 
Christos Batzios is also a dancer, performing Contemporary Dance, Acrobatic Dance, Latin and other dances. He sings in music theater plays and writes lyrics for songs and for his plays. Batzios has also been a radio producer.

Selected filmography & plays

Business and productions
Christos Batzios is also the founder of the production company PROMiS Productions and the media group PROMiS Media.

References

External links
Official website of Christos Batzios
Ntropis Pragmata - The comedy by Christos Batzios on Tour for a 3rd season 
Christos Batzios and Maria Androutsou Interview
You Tube
MENT Basketball Club goes to Final4
Christos Batzios celebrated the birthday of PROMiS Media and Texnospito with celebrities

Living people
Greek male film actors
Greek male television actors
21st-century Greek male actors
People from Kavala
Year of birth missing (living people)
Basketball players from Kavala